Amun-her-khepeshef (also Amun-her-khepeshef B) was the eldest son and appointed heir of Pharaoh Ramesses III. Like at least another of his brothers, he was named after a son of Ramesses II, Amun-her-khepeshef.
 He died when he was about fifteen years old.

He is also mentioned as Ramesses Amun-her-khepeshef. He is not identical with his brother Ramesses VI, who was also called Amun-her-khepeshef before he became pharaoh.

He is depicted in his father's temple at Medinet Habu. His well preserved tomb, QV55 (in the Valley of the Queens) was excavated by Italian archaeologists in 1903–1904.

Sources

Ancient Egyptian princes
Ramesses III
People of the Twentieth Dynasty of Egypt
Heirs to the ancient Egyptian throne
12th-century BC people
Heirs apparent who never acceded

Royalty who died as children